Roka is a Khum (commune) of Sangkae District in Battambang Province in north-western Cambodia.

Villages

 Chhung Tradak
 Pou Batdambang
 Ambaeng Thngae
 Roka
 Ta Haen Muoy
 Ta Haen Pir

References

Communes of Battambang province
Sangkae District